Tower of jewels may refer to: 

Echium simplex, plant native to Tenerife, Canary Islands
Echium virescens, plant native to Tenerife, Canary Islands
Echium wildpretii, plant native to Tenerife, Canary Islands
Tower of Jewels (Lakeside Amusement Park), building at amusement park near Denver, Colorado
Tower of Jewels (PPIE), central building at the Panama-Pacific International Exposition, the 1915 world's fair in San Francisco, California
The Tower of Jewels, a 1920 American crime drama film directed by Tom Terriss